Bansont (also Romanized as Bānsont and Bānesont; also known as Bāksūnat and Bānsunt) is a village in Jahliyan Rural District, in the Central District of Konarak County, Sistan and Baluchestan Province, Iran. At the 2006 census, its population was 1,475, in 273 families.

References 

Populated places in Konarak County